Ip' Efthini Mou (Greek: Υπ' Ευθύνη Μου; English: Under My Responsibility) is the fourth album by Greek artist, Natasa Theodoridou. It was released on 6 July 2001 by Sony Music Greece and received gold certification, selling 40,000 units*. The album was written by several artists, including Triantaphillos, Natalia Germanou, and Eleni Giannatsoulia. It also contains the song "Kataziteitai" which is a cover of Ojos Así, previously performed by Shakira.

* In 2001, gold was the album whose sales exceeded 25,000 units.

Track listing

Singles 
Four songs becoming singles to radio stations with music videos and gained a lot of airplay.

 "Kataziteitai" (Wanted)
 "Sou Vazo Diskola" (I Make It Difficult For You)
 "Ti Ftaio" (What Is My Fault)
 "Ipokrisia" (Hypocrisy)

Credits 
Credits adapted from liner notes.

Personnel 
Giannis Bithikotsis – bouzouki (tracks: 3, 4, 5, 6, 10, 12, 14) / cura (tracks: 3, 4, 9, 14) / baglama (tracks: 3, 5, 9, 10, 12, 14)
Vasilis Diamantis – soprano saxophone (tracks: 17)
Akis Diximos – second vocal (tracks: 1, 3, 5, 9, 10, 12)
Vasilis Gkinos – orchestration, programming (tracks: 2, 16)
Thanos Gkiouletzis – violin (tracks: 5, 7)
Antonis Gounaris – orchestration, programming, guitar (tracks: 1, 3, 4, 5, 6, 7, 9, 10, 11, 12, 13, 14, 15, 17) / cura (tracks: 8, 11, 13, 17) / cümbüş (tracks: 8, 13) / oud (tracks: 1)
Anna Ioannidou – backing vocals (tracks: 1, 2, 4, 6, 8, 11, 13, 14, 16)
Katerina Kiriakou – backing vocals (tracks: 1, 2, 4, 6, 8, 11, 13, 14, 16)
Antonis Koulouris – drums (tracks: 3, 5, 10, 12, 14)

Production 
Takis Argiriou (Argiriou Recordings studio) – sound engineer, mix engineer
Vasilis Bouloubasis – hair styling
Thodoris Chrisanthopoulos (Fabelsound) – mastering
Ntinos Diamantopoulos – photographer
Giannis Doulamis – production manager
Iakovos Kalaitzakis – make up
Dimitris Rekouniotis – art direction
Giorgos Segredakis – styling
Katerina Sideridou – cover processing

Charts 
Ip' Efthini Mou made its debut at number 2 on the 'Greece Top 50 Albums' charts.

References 

Natasa Theodoridou albums
Greek-language albums
2001 albums
Sony Music Greece albums